The 2019–20 Penn State Nittany Lions basketball team represented Pennsylvania State University in the 2019–20 NCAA Division I men's basketball season. They were led by head coach Pat Chambers, in his ninth season with the team, and played their home games at the Bryce Jordan Center in University Park, Pennsylvania as members of the Big Ten Conference. They finished the season 21–10, 11–9 in Big Ten play to finish in a four-way tie for fifth place. Their season ended following the cancellation of postseason tournaments due to the coronavirus pandemic.

Previous season 
The Nittany Lions finished the 2018–19 season 14–18, 7–13 in Big Ten play to finish in a three-way tie for 10th place. They lost to Minnesota in the second round of the Big Ten tournament.

Offseason

Departures

Incoming transfers

Recruiting classes

2019 recruiting class

2020 recruiting class

Roster

Coaching Staff

Schedule and results

|-
!colspan=9 style=|Regular season

|-
!colspan=9 style=|Big Ten tournament

Rankings

*AP does not release post-NCAA Tournament rankings

On December 16, 2019 Penn State was ranked #23 in the Associated Press Poll marking its first appearance in the poll since 1996.

References

Penn State Nittany Lions basketball seasons
Penn State
Penn State
Penn State